Dynamic modality is a linguistic modality that is the ability or requirement of the subject to do something. Dynamic modality is non-subjective in contrast to the similar deontic modality. Dynamic modality is expressed with "can" or "will."

References

Grammatical moods
Formal semantics (natural language)